Adam Thorp Brown (born 16 January 1989) is an English competition swimmer who has represented Great Britain at the Olympics and FINA world championships, and England at the Commonwealth Games.  Brown specialises in the 50-metre and 100-metre freestyle sprint swimming events.

He moved to Australia to the Gold Coast, Queensland to attend The Southport School in 2006, from which he graduated in December 2007.  Brown accepted an athletic scholarship to attend Auburn University in Auburn, Alabama, where he swam for coach David Marsh and coach Brett Hawke's Auburn Tigers swimming and diving team in National Collegiate Athletic Association (NCAA) and Southeastern Conference (SEC) competition from 2008 to 2011.  He married Mary Casey Brown in October 2012 in Cleveland, Alabama, and continues to live and train in Auburn.

He has been a part of the British senior national team since 2008 where he represented Great Britain at the 2008 Summer Olympics in the 4×100-metre freestyle relay.  He also represented Great Britain at the 2009 World Championships in Rome, Italy.  He was a part of the English team at the 2010 Commonwealth Games in Delhi, India.  He swam for Great Britain at the 2011 World Championships in Shanghai, China.  The following year he got to represent Great Britain at the 2012 Olympic Games in London.  In 2013 he went on to compete at the 2013 World Championships in Barcelona.

At the 2014 Commonwealth Games, he was part of the England team that won a gold in the 4 x 100 m medley relay in a new Games record, and bronze in the 4 x 100 m freestyle relay.

Results

 2008-Beijing Olympic Games-4 × 100 m Freestyle Relay-8th Place
 2009-Rome World Championships-50m Freestyle-40th
 2009-Rome World Championships-100m Freestyle-28th
 2009-Rome World Championships-4 × 100 m Freestyle Relay-7th
 2010-Delhi Commonwealth Games-50m Freestyle-6th
 2010-Delhi Commonwealth Games-100m Freestyle-8th
 2010-Delhi Commonwealth Games-4 × 100 m Freestyle Relay-SILVER MEDAL
 2010-Delhi Commonwealth Games-4 × 100 m Medley Relay (heats only)-BRONZE MEDAL
 2011-Shanghai World Championships-50m Freestyle-13th
 2011-Shanghai World Championships-100m Freestyle-21st
 2011-Shanghai World Championships-4 × 100 m Freestyle Relay-8th
 2011-Shanghai World Championships-4 × 100 m Medley Relay-6th
 2012-London Olympic Games-50m Freestyle-20th
 2012-London Olympic Games-100m Freestyle-20th
 2012-London Olympic Games-4 × 100 m Medley Relay-4th
 2013-Barcelona World Championships-50m Freestyle-17th
 2013-Barcelona World Championships-100m Freestyle-9th
 2013-Barcelona World Championships-4 × 100 m Medley Relay-9th

Best Times

References

External links
 
 
 
 
 
 
 
 British Swimming athlete profile
 

1989 births
Living people
Auburn Tigers men's swimmers
English male freestyle swimmers
Olympic swimmers of Great Britain
Swimmers at the 2008 Summer Olympics
Swimmers at the 2012 Summer Olympics
Commonwealth Games medallists in swimming
Commonwealth Games gold medallists for England
Commonwealth Games bronze medallists for England
Commonwealth Games silver medallists for England
Swimmers at the 2010 Commonwealth Games
Swimmers at the 2014 Commonwealth Games
Sportspeople from Cambridge
21st-century English people
Medallists at the 2010 Commonwealth Games
Medallists at the 2014 Commonwealth Games